Tamara Natalia Christina Mayawati Bleszynski (Polish: Tamara Natalia Christina Mayawati Błeszyński), also known as Tamara Bleszynski (Polish: Tamara Błeszyński) (born December 25, 1974) is an Indonesian actress, singer, and model. Bleszynski began her career in the soap opera Anakku Terlahir Kembali in RCTI in 1996.

Early life
Bleszynski's father is Zbigniew Błeszyński, who is of Polish descent, and her mother is Farida Gasik, of Sunda descent. She completed her education in Indonesia and subsequently in Perth, Australia. She has been interested in acting most of her life. She took extracurricular drama classes in junior high school and continued acting in high school. She obtained a bachelor's degree of Business Management in St Brigid's College Australia, but continued to be interested in acting, so she joined the Theatre Institute.

Career
On return to Indonesia, Bleszynski was noticed in a record store by Jay Subiyakto, who suggested she should become a model. She got a contract to advertise Lux, a beauty soap.

Bleszynski began acting in soap operas with her appearance in Anakku Terlahir Kembali (1996) and its sequel, where she appeared with teen idol Desy Ratnasari. Returning to acting after the birth of her child in 2000, she appeared in Doa Membawa Berkah (2000), directed by Ahmad Yusuf. She converted to Islam, and began appearing in religious soap operas. She played in Wah Cantiknya !!! (2001) and Hikmah (2004), for which she won "Favorite Actress" at 2004 and 2005 Panasonic Awards.

Bleszynski's first appearance in film was in Issue (2004), followed by Big Day (2006). In 2008, Bleszynski  played the action figure Rrama in Cicakman 2: Planet Hitam and in 2009 worked in the slasher film Air Terjun Pengantin. For this role, she tanned her skin and trained to create an athletic body for the martial arts scenes in her role as Tiara.

Other movies she has appeared in include Opera SMU (2002), Ikhlas (2003), Issue (2004), Putri Cantik (2004), Goal (2005), and Cinta Itu Nggak Buta (2007).  She appeared in the television film Dibalik Jendela Astrid in 2002). With the Theater Institute, she was cast as Calpurnia, wife of Julius Caesar in Julius Caesar (1997).

Personal life
Bleszynski converted to Islam in 1995. She married Teuku Rafly Pasha in 1997, and they have one son. They divorced in 2007. She married Mike Lewis (model) in 2010, and they have one son of this interfaith marriage. They divorced in 2012.
Bleszynski continues to work as an  actor, model, and brand ambassador, and is part owner in a restaurant, Resto Negev, where she also acted as a chef.

Discography

Single

Video clip

Filmography

Film

Television

Film Television

TV commercials
 Pond's Age Miracle
 Lux
 Guess (Guess Girl)
 Kia
 Mazda
 Samsung
 Sogo
 Kopi Luwak
 Bio Fibra
 Bank Tamara
 Vaseline
 Visine
 Nivea
 Altex
 Markisa Juice Pohon Pinang
 King Halim Jewellery
 Icon of Glamorous & Elegant Woman for Arantxa Adi Designer 
 Duta Baca 2005 Perpustakaan Nasional Republik Indonesia
 Duta Tinju Indonesia
 Ikon Tenun Songket NTT (Tenun Ikat)
 Duta Perdamaian Indonesia-Timor Leste
 Icon of Preview by Itang Yunaz
 Tupperware

Awards and nominations

References

External links
  https://web.archive.org/web/20100718015757/http://www.playwithbeauty-id.com/tamara/
  Videografi Tamara Bleszynski di YouTube
  Profil di situs web DiscTarra
  Berita mengenai perceraian
  Situs web penggemar Tamara Bleszynski

1974 births
Living people
Indonesian film actresses
21st-century Indonesian actresses
Actresses from West Java
People from Bandung
21st-century Indonesian women singers
Indonesian female models
Indonesian people of Polish descent
Converts to Sunni Islam from Catholicism
Indonesian former Christians
Indonesian Muslims
Indo people
Sundanese people